A Trip to Chinatown is a musical comedy in three acts by Charles H. Hoyt with music by Percy Gaunt and lyrics by Hoyt.  In addition to the Gaunt and Hoyt score, many songs were interpolated into the score at one time or another during the run, as was fashionable for musicals of the era.  The story concerns a widow who accidentally maneuvers several young suburban couples into a big city restaurant and brings romance to them and herself, as in Hello, Dolly!

After almost a year of touring, the musical opened at Broadway’s Madison Square Theater on November 9, 1891, and ran for 657 performances, or just short of two years.  This was the longest-running Broadway musical in history up to that time (although London had seen a few longer runs), and it held that record until Irene in 1919.  The show was such a hit that several road companies played it throughout the country simultaneously with the Broadway production, and at one point a second company was even opened in New York while the original company was still performing on Broadway.  The cast included Trixie Friganza and Harry Conor, who introduced "The Bowery".

A version of the show was produced in 1912 under the title A Winsome Widow, and a film adaptation featuring Anna May Wong was made in 1926.

Background
Hoyt was born in Concord, New Hampshire (USA) in  1859.  In the 1870s, Hoyt became musical and dramatic critic of The Boston Post.  Beginning in 1883, he began a career as a playwright, producing a series of twenty farcical comedies (roughly one per year until his death) and a comic opera. Hoyt had his own theater, the Madison Square Theater, where A Trip to Chinatown was performed.

A Trip to Chinatown was Hoyt's 10th play.  Hoyt's plays emphasized individualized characters drawn from the everyday experiences of ordinary people.  Most of his plays were non-musical farces.  Two of the songs from the show are still known, "The Bowery" and "Reuben and Cynthia."  There were many interpolations of songs into A Trip to Chinatown due to the many touring companies, the most famous being Charles K. Harris's "After the Ball," which was not part of the 1891 Broadway production but became a big hit and was later interpolated into Show Boat to exemplify the 1890s style.

Versions of the script can be found in the 1941 Princeton University Press collection, Five Plays by Charles Hoyt edited by Douglas L. Hunt.  In addition the George Washington University has microfiche copies of three versions of Hoyt's script, which changed as the cast changed, and differed from tour to tour.

Synopsis
A group of young people in San Francisco tell their wealthy guardian, Uncle Ben, that they are going sightseeing in Chinatown.  They really plan a night out on the town.  They have engaged a chaperone, Mrs. Guyer, but her letter of acceptance is received by Uncle Ben, who misinterprets it as an invitation to a rendezvous.  At "The Riche", the restaurant mentioned in the letter, where the young people have booked a table, he gets drunk.  He does not see the young couples or Mrs. Guyer, and it turns out that he has forgotten his wallet, which leads to humorous complications.  Ben is unable to scold the young people for deceiving him, as they point out that they know about his own night out.

Roles and original Broadway cast

Welland Strong (a man with one foot in the grave) - Harry Conor
Ben Gay (a wealthy bachelor) - George A. Beane, Jr.
Tony Gay (his ward) - Avery Strakosch
Rashleigh Gay (his nephew) - Lloyd Wilson
Norman Blood (chum of Rashleigh) - Arthur Pacie
Willie Grow (a gilded youth - a trouser role) - Blanche Arkwright (later Queenie Vassar)
Noah Heap (waiter) - Harry Gilfoil
Slavin Payne (Ben's servant) - Harry Gilfoil
Turner Swift (runs the ice crusher) - W. S. Lewis
Isabel Dame (friend of the Gays) - Geraldine McCann
Hoffman Price (manager of Cliff House) - Frank E. Morsk
Mrs. Guyer (a widow) - Anna Boyd
Flirt (Mrs. Guyer's maid) - Patrice
Dancers

Musical numbers
The Bowery
Reuben and Cynthia
The Widow
Push Dem Clouds Away (an African cantata)
The Chaperone
Out for a Racket
After the Ball
The Sunshine of Paradise Alley
Love Me Little, Love Me Long
Do, Do, My Huckleberry, Do
Keep A-Knockin’
Riding on the Golden Bike
Her Eyes Don't Shine like Diamonds
Only One Girl in the World for Me
Then Say Good Bye!
She's My Best Girl
Back among the Old Folks Once Again
McGee's Back Yard

1912 revision
In 1912, a revised version of the musical was produced by Florenz Ziegfeld, Jr., with a score by Raymond Hubbell, called A Winsome Widow.

1926 film

A silent film adaptation of the musical was released in 1926, called A Trip to Chinatown, starring Margaret Livingston and featuring Anna May Wong and Charles Farrell.  The screenplay was by Beatrice Van, based on Hoyt's book, and the film was directed by Robert P. Kerr.

Notes

References
Information about the musical (Archived 2009-10-23)
Profile of the musical and photo of a program

External links

 
A Trip to Chinatown at the IMDB database
Profile and poster of the musical
List of longest-running plays

Broadway musicals
1891 musicals